Sir John Molesworth, 5th Baronet (1729–1775) was a British politician who sat in the House of Commons from 1765 to 1775.
 
Molesworth was the son of Sir John Molesworth, 4th Baronet and was born on 12 March 1729. He matriculated at  Balliol College, Oxford on 14 March 1749  and was awarded MA on 17 May 1751. He married firstly Frances Smyth daughter of James Smyth of St Audries, Somerset on 28 September 1755. After she died in 1758 he married Barbara St Aubyn, daughter of Sir John St Aubyn, 3rd Baronet on 2 September 1762.

Molesworth was returned unopposed as Member of Parliament for Cornwall in a by-election in 1765. He succeeded his father in the baronetcy on 4 April 1766 and completed the work on the rebuilding of Pencarrow. He was returned again for Cornwall in the 1768 general election. In 1771 Molesworth started the Truro Bank, together with Edward Eliot and Humphrey Mackworth Praed. In the 1774 general election Molesworth was returned for Cornwall again.

Molesworth died at Pencarrow, on 20 October 1775, and was buried at Egloshayle on 26 October. He was succeeded by his son William.

References

1729 births
1775 deaths
British bankers
Alumni of Balliol College, Oxford
British MPs 1761–1768
British MPs 1768–1774
British MPs 1774–1780
Members of the Parliament of Great Britain for English constituencies
Baronets in the Baronetage of England
Members of the Parliament of Great Britain for Cornwall